Jorge Saiz Colomer (born 11 September 2000), commonly known as Koke, is a Spanish footballer who plays as a left winger for CD Alcoyano.

Club career
Born in Moncada, Valencian Community, Koke started his career at Valencia CF's youth setup before moving to CF Torre Levante in 2017. He made his senior debut with the latter on 4 May 2019, coming on as a second-half substitute in a 2–1 Tercera División home win against UD Rayo Ibense.

On 29 July 2019, Koke moved to CD Castellón and was assigned to the reserves in the regional leagues. He made his first-team debut on 30 May 2021, starting in a 0–3 away loss against Málaga CF in the Segunda División, as his side was already relegated.

References

External links

2000 births
Living people
People from Horta Nord
Sportspeople from the Province of Valencia
Spanish footballers
Footballers from the Valencian Community
Association football wingers
Segunda División players
Primera Federación players
Tercera División players
Tercera Federación players
Divisiones Regionales de Fútbol players
CF Torre Levante players
CD Castellón footballers